Martha Lissette Silva Zapata (born 11 October 1992) is a Nicaraguan footballer who plays as a defender for the Nicaragua women's national team.

Early life
Silva was born in Managua.

International goals
Scores and results list Nicaragua's goal tally first

References 

1992 births
Living people
Sportspeople from Managua
Nicaraguan women's footballers
Women's association football defenders
Nicaragua women's international footballers
Central American Games silver medalists for Nicaragua
Central American Games medalists in football